Thomas Burton was one of two Members of the Parliament of England for the constituency of York on two occasions between 1529–1533 and from 1533–1536

Life and politics

The early years of Thomas' life are not recorded. He is believed to have married Maud Wylde around 1490 with whom he had one son, Anthony , and one daughter, Margaret. In 1511 he became esquire at sword to the Lord Mayor of York. Three years later he joined the merchants guild and rose to the rank of master. He became Lord Mayor in 1522 when the incumbent, Paul Gyllour died. He resigned the post to become MP for he city along with his trading partner John Norman. He died in 1525.

References

Members of the Parliament of England for constituencies in Yorkshire